Karl Ludwig Börne (born "Loeb Baruch"; 6 May 1786 – 12 February 1837) was a German-Jewish political writer and satirist, who is considered part of the Young Germany movement.

Early life
Karl Ludwig Börne was born Loeb Baruch on 6 May 1786, at Frankfurt am Main, to a Jewish family. He was the son of Jakob Baruch, a banker. His grandfather had been a government bureaucrat.

Education
Börne and his brothers were privately tutored by Jacob Sachs, and later by Rector Mosche. At age 14, he studied medicine with Professor Hetzel at Gießen.  After a year, he was sent to study medicine at Berlin under a physician, Markus Herz, in whose house he lived. At age 16, Baruch became infatuated by his patron's 38-year-old wife, Henriette Herz. After her husband died in 1803, he expressed his adoration in a series of letters. When he enrolled at Halle University, she was influential in his boarding with Professor Reil. He studied constitutional law and political science at University of Heidelberg and Giessen. There, he received his PhD in 1809 with the dissertation Ueber die Geometrische Vertheilung der Staatsgebiete.

Career
On his return to Frankfurt, now constituted as a grand duchy under the sovereignty of the prince bishop Karl von Dalberg, he received (1811) the appointment of police actuary in that city.

In 1814, he had to resign his post due to his ethnicity. Embittered by the oppression suffered by Jews in Germany, he took to journalism and edited the Frankfurt liberal newspapers Staatsristretto and Die Zeitschwingen.

Later life
In 1818, he converted to Lutheran Protestantism, changing his name from Loeb Baruch to Ludwig Börne. From 1818 to 1821, he edited Die Wage, a paper distinguished by its lively political articles and its powerful but sarcastic theatrical criticisms. This paper was suppressed by the police, and in 1821, Börne took a pause from journalism and led a quiet life in Paris, Hamburg, and Frankfurt.

After the July Revolution (1830), he hurried to Paris, expecting to find society nearer to his own ideas of freedom. Although to some extent disappointed in his hopes, he did not look any more kindly on the political condition of Germany; this lent additional zest to the brilliant satirical letters (Briefe aus Paris, 1830–1833, published Paris, 1834), which he began to publish in his last literary venture, La Balance, a revival of Die Wage. The Briefe aus Paris was Börne's most important publication, and a landmark in the history of German journalism. Its appearance led him to be regarded as a leading thinker in Germany.

Death and legacy
He died in Paris in 1837.

Nothing is permanent but change, nothing constant but death. Every pulsation of the heart inflicts a wound, and life would be an endless bleeding were it not for Poetry. She secures to us what Nature would deny – a golden age without rust, a spring which never fades, cloudless prosperity and eternal youth. Ludwig Börne, Quoted by Heinrich Heine in The Journey to the Harz (1824)

Börne's works are known for brilliant style and for thorough French satire. His best criticism is to be found in his Denkrede auf Jean Paul (1826), a writer for whom he had warm sympathy and admiration; in his Dramaturgische Blätter (1829–1834); and the witty satire, Menzel der Franzosenfresser (1837). He also wrote a number of short stories and sketches, of which the best known are the Monographie der deutschen Postschnecke (1829) and Der Esskünstler (1822). 
Ernest Jones in his first volume of Sigmund Freud's biography relates that "Böeme" [sic] was an especial favourite in Freud's adolescence, a half century later quoting many passages from the essay "The Art of Becoming an Original Writer", which clearly played a part in Freud's putting his trust in free association during psycho-analysis:
Here follows the practical prescription I promised. Take a few sheets of paper and for three days in succession write down, without any falsification or hypocrisy, everything that comes into your head. Write what you think of yourself, of your women, of the Turkish War, of Goethe... of the last judgment, of those senior to you in authority -- and when the three days are over you will be amazed at what novel and startling thoughts have welled up in you. That is the art of becoming an original writer in three days.
Two portraits of him, by the Jewish painter Daniel M. Oppenheim, are in the Israel Museum Collection.

Bibliography
 Gesammelte Schriften (trans. "Collected Writings"), in 4 volumes (1829–1834)
 Nachgelassene Schriften (trans. "Posthumous Writings"), in 6 volumes (Mannheim, 1844–1850)
 Nachgelassene Schriften (trans. "Posthumous Writings"), in 12 volumes (Hamburg, 1862–1863, reprint 1868)
 Nachgelassene Schriften (trans. "Posthumous Writings") edited by A. Klaar in 8 volumes (Leipzig, 1900) 
 Börnes Leben (trans. "The Life of Börne"), (Hamburg: K. Gutzkow, 1840)
 L. Börne, sein Leben und sein Wirken (trans. "L. Börne, his Life and his works"), (Berlin: M. Holzmann, 1888)
 Börnes Briefe an Henriette Herz (trans. "Börne's Letters to Henriette Herz"), (1802–1807) re-edited by L. Geiger (Oldenburg, 1905)
 Börnes Berliner Briefe (trans. "Börne's Berlin Letters") (Berlin, 1905) 
 Historische Schriften (trans. "Historical Writings"), (Darmstadt: G. Gervinus, 1838). (essay)
 Hovedströmninger i det 19 de Aarhundredes Litteratur vol. vi. (Copenhagen: G. Brandes, 1890; German trans. 1891; English trans. 1905)
 Das junge Deutschland (trans. "The Young Germany") (Stuttgart: J. Proelss, 1892).

Legacy
The town of Boerne in the U.S. state of Texas, founded by German liberal immigrants (Forty-Eighters), is named after him. The town is a part of the San Antonio metropolitan area.

The Börne Gallery at the Jewish Museum Frankfurt in Frankfurt, Germany is also named after him.

References

Sources

External links

 
 
 

1786 births
1837 deaths
Writers from Frankfurt
German Lutherans
Converts to Lutheranism from Judaism
Jewish German writers
University of Giessen alumni
German emigrants to France
German male writers
Burials at Père Lachaise Cemetery
19th-century Lutherans